"What Love Looks Like" is a song recorded by Canadian country music artist Michelle Wright. It was released in 1997 as the fourth single from her fifth studio album, For Me It's You. It peaked at number 4 on the RPM Country Tracks chart in September 1997.

Chart performance

Year-end charts

References

1997 singles
Michelle Wright songs
Arista Nashville singles
1996 songs
Songs written by Michelle Wright